CLC International is an International Christian Literature mission committed to the distribution of the Bible, Christian books and a variety of Christian media. CLC works in 43 countries and has more than 600 workers worldwide. It is represented by more than 120 bookshops, 18 distribution warehouses and 22 publishing houses.

History

CLC was founded in 1941 in Colchester, England by Ken Adams and his wife Bessie as “The Evangelical Publishing House”. This publishing house worked actively even through the difficulties of the Second World War. Early on they aligned themselves with WEC International and its Secretary Norman Grubb. In 1944 the first departments appeared out of England: in Australia and Canada; next non-English CLC bookshops were founded in the United States and Dominica in 1947. After that, the opening of new bookshops and Christian publishing houses took place almost every year.  CLC International is established in 43 countries. It is represented by more than 120 bookshops, 18 distribution warehouses and 22 publishing houses.

Organization
The headquarters of CLC International are situated in Sheffield, United Kingdom. Gary Chamberlin was elected as the new International Director in 2021, succeeding Gerardo Scalante. The CLC work in each country is set up independently. While CLC departments are united by common vision, goals and International Constitution, they are independent in the realization of the declared goals.

See also
Evangelism
Christian literature
Christian media

References

External links 
 

Evangelical Christian publishing companies
Bible societies
Christian organizations established in the 20th century
Book publishing companies of the United Kingdom
Christian organizations established in 1941
Publishing companies established in 1941
Christian bookstores
British companies established in 1941
1941 establishments in England